Parietaria floridana, common name Florida pellitory, is a plant species native to the southeastern United States, the West Indies, and much of Latin America. In the US, the heart of its range extends from Florida, to Georgia and North and South Carolina, with isolated populations reported in Mississippi, Louisiana, Texas, New Hampshire, Kentucky and Delaware. Some populations in California have in the past been referred to as P. floridana  but are now regarded as a separate species, P. hespera.

Parietaria floridana is a branched herb growing up to 40 cm tall, sometimes running along the ground. Leaves are up to 3 cm long. Flowers are up to 4 mm across. Achenes are less than 0.9 mm long.

References

floridana
Flora of Central America
Flora of South America
Flora of the Caribbean
Flora of Mexico
Flora of the Eastern United States
Plants described in 1818
Taxa named by Thomas Nuttall
Flora without expected TNC conservation status